The 2012 Qatar motorcycle Grand Prix was the first round of the 2012 MotoGP season. It was held at the Losail International Circuit near Doha in Qatar on 8 April 2012. It was contested over twenty-two laps. 
 
This race saw the début of the 1000cc engine motorcycles introduced in the MotoGP class for this season and also the début of the Honda RC213V, replacing the 800cc engines and the Honda RC212V that were used between 2007 and 2011,  and also the début of the 125cc 2-stroke replacement class, Moto3, which are powered by 250cc (15.2 cu in) 4-stroke engines.

Classification

MotoGP

Moto2

Moto3

Championship standings after the race (MotoGP)
Below are the standings for the top five riders and constructors after round one has concluded.

Riders' Championship standings

Constructors' Championship standings

 Note: Only the top five positions are included for both sets of standings.

References

Qatar motorcycle Grand Prix
Qatar
Motorcycle Grand Prix
Qatar motorcycle Grand Prix